Sami Bey Vrioni (1876–1947) was an Albanian politician, diplomat, and a delegate at the Assembly of Vlora which declared the Albanian Declaration of Independence. He was a respected and powerful landowner in the Fier region of Albania.

Biography
Sami Vrioni was a member of the prominent landowning Vrioni family of Berat, Fier and Myzeqe. His father was Omar Pasha Vrioni II (1839–1928). Sami Vrioni himself was owner of around 5,000 Hectares in the agricultural region of southern Myzeqe.

He was one of the delegates of the Albanian Declaration of Independence in 1912, representing Berat region. According to some sources, Ismail Qemali wanted him as part of his cabinet, but his father Omer Pasha was skeptical regarding the Qemali's government. Having served as parliamentary Deputy for Berat in 1912, under Prince Wied he served as a seneschal (Court Chamberlain). He was part of the Albanian delegation in Vienna of April 1917 representing the districts of Skrapar and Berat.

Sami Vrioni had graduated as agronomist and engineer. He spoke Turkish, Arabic, Italian, and French.

He was a participant of the Congress of Durrës and was elected Minister of Agriculture of the provisional government that came out of it, switching to Minister of Public Works in 1919–1920. According to Sejfi Vllamasi's (1883–1975) memories, Vrioni together with Mustafa Kruja, Fejzi Alizoti, and Myfid Libohova joined the camp of the pro-Italian opponents of the Congress of Lushnjë, with the three others actively trying to persuade or force the delegates not to join the Lushnjë event.

Served as Assemblyman (1924–1925, 1928–1932) and Senator (1925–1928) of the Albanian parliament. Regardless of the fact that he descended from a landowning feudal cast, Sami Vrioni had credibility between the Nolist opposition of early 20s. In February 1924, the opposition was hoping on bringing him up as Prime Minister, which was disregarded by the most powerful group of Ahmet Zogu, who elected Shefqet Vërlaci instead of him.
Vrioni was arrested by the communist dictatorship that took power in 1944, he died under torture in 1947 or 1952.

Sami Vrioni was married to the daughter of Essad Pasha Toptani.

Political Activity
 Delegate of the Albanian Declaration of Independence event in 1912
 Court Chamberlain of Prince of Albania, 1914
 Minister of Agriculture of Albania: December 1918 – 1919
 Minister of Public Works of Albania: 1919 – January 1920
 Assemblyman (1924–1925, 1928–1932) 
 Member of Albanian Senate (1925–1928)

References
Citations

Source

See also
 Ilias Bey Vrioni
 Omar Pasha Vrioni II
 Albanian Declaration of Independence

Albanian diplomats
Albanian torture victims
1947 deaths
1876 births
Albanians from the Ottoman Empire
19th-century Albanian politicians
20th-century Albanian politicians
People from Berat
Sami
Government ministers of Albania
Agriculture ministers of Albania
All-Albanian Congress delegates
Government of Durrës
Congress of Durrës delegates